The 1981–82 Idaho Vandals men's basketball team represented the University of Idaho during the 1981–82 NCAA Division I men's basketball season. The defending champions of the Big Sky Conference, Vandals were led by fourth-year head coach Don Monson and played their home games on campus at the Kibbie Dome in Moscow, Idaho.

The 1982 basketball team was the most successful in the school's history, and has yet to be surpassed. Building upon the success of the previous season, the Vandals won their first 16 games and went 24–2 in the regular season.  They defeated Gonzaga and all four Pac-10 teams from the Northwest. Idaho won the eight-team Far West Classic in Portland in late December 1981, winning all three games by at least 19 points (over Iowa State, Oregon State, and Oregon).

The Vandals' only setbacks during the regular season were consecutive two-point road losses in late January. The first was to rival Montana on a raucous Saturday night in Missoula on a tip-in at the buzzer. The second was to Notre Dame in South Bend two days later, ending a three-games-in-four-nights road trip, which included multiple weather-related travel delays and re-routes, and a 4:30 am arrival in South Bend on game day. Although the Vandals hit 14 of their first 15 shots to jump to  lead over the Irish, Notre Dame regrouped at home to win by two in overtime. Idaho was awarded just four free throws in the 45 minutes of play and missed them all. Notre Dame was led by future NBA guard John Paxson in 1982. The Vandals then won eight straight games to conclude the regular season, and won the four-team conference tournament, which they hosted for the second straight year as regular season champions.

Their 26–2 record after the Big Sky tournament (& ten straight victories) earned the Vandals a #8 national ranking and a #3 seed in the West region of the 48-team NCAA tournament, which included a first round bye.

NCAA tournament
The opponent was 16th-ranked Iowa of the Big Ten, the region's sixth seed, then coached by Lute Olson. A Final Four team two years earlier, Iowa won their first-round game handily, but Idaho won this close game by two points,  in overtime, and advanced to the Sweet 16.  

Four days later at the West regional in Provo, Utah, they met the nation's fourth-ranked team, Oregon State, the #2 seed in the West region.  Idaho had defeated the Beavers by 22 points in December at the Far West Classic in Portland, but this time the result was far different, as the Beavers won 60–42.  OSU was defeated two days later by the region's #1 seed Georgetown, led by freshman center Patrick Ewing. (Georgetown advanced to the national final, where they lost by a point to North Carolina.)

Aftermath
Eight straight wins elevated them to sixth prior to the Big Sky tournament, and were eighth in both final polls entering the NCAA tournament.

Just before their two losses in January, the team was featured in a two-page article in Sports Illustrated. (team photo)  The alley-oop was a frequently used play against man-to-man defenses, and sophomore Pete Prigge was the sixth man.

Monson was named the Kodak Coach of the Year in Division I in 1982 (photo) and rumors were rampant that he would jump to a higher league, maybe to struggling Arizona in the Pac-10. That position was eventually filled by Lute Olson (a year later), and Monson chose to stay for a fifth season at Idaho. With a salary of about $40,000 in 1982 and a one-year contract, an "appreciation fund" was set up by local fans to entice him to stay in  The 1982 team was inducted into the Vandal Athletics Hall of Fame, as was Monson, Kellerman, and Owens.

All-conference
All five starters were recognized by the conference. Senior point guard Owens was the Big Sky's player of the year and a repeat MVP in the conference tournament. He was joined in the backcourt of the all-conference team by junior guard Kellerman, the previous season's player of the year. Vandals on the second team were the forwards, senior Herbert and junior Hopson; junior center Smith was honorable mention.

Roster

Schedule and results

|-
!colspan=9 style=| Big Sky tournament

|-
!colspan=9 style=| NCAA tournament

References

External links
Sports Reference – Idaho Vandals: 1981–82 basketball season
Gem of the Mountains: 1982 University of Idaho yearbook – 1981–82 basketball season
Idaho Argonaut – student newspaper – 1982 editions

Idaho Vandals men's basketball seasons
Idaho
Idaho
Idaho
Idaho